David Bailey (October 27, 1933 – November 25, 2004) was an American actor. Born in Newark, New Jersey, he went on to have a lengthy career in theater and television, perhaps his best known role being Dr. Russ Matthews on the long-running daytime soap Another World (1973–1981, 1989, 1992).

On November 25, 2004, Bailey drowned in the pool at his home in Los Angeles, California. He was 71 years old. His grave is located in Forest Lawn – Hollywood Hills Cemetery.

At the time of his death he had been playing Alistair Crane on the daytime soap Passions for less than three months, to great fan and critical praise. After his death, the role was recast with soap actor John Reilly. 
The following year, Bailey's son Xander had a small role on Passions as Edmund, a man who dated Alistair's granddaughter, Fancy.

Filmography

References

External links

1933 births
2004 deaths
Deaths by drowning in California
Accidental deaths in California
American male soap opera actors
Male actors from Newark, New Jersey
Burials at Forest Lawn Memorial Park (Hollywood Hills)
Male actors from New Jersey
20th-century American male actors